is a public park in Nomizu, Chōfu, Tokyo. It is located at the intersection of Chofu with Koganei and Mitaka, and parts of the park extend to those cities as well.

History
The land for the park was purchased from International Christian University in 1974. It had previously been used as a golf course by the school.

Geography
The park is bordered to the north by International Christian University, and partially surrounds the American School in Japan campus. A pedestrian bridge connects two parts of the park which are separated by Tokyo Metropolitan Route 14.

References

Parks and gardens in Tokyo
Chōfu, Tokyo